Rachel Barr, Ph.D. is a professor at Georgetown University. She is currently the co-director of graduate studies in the Department of Psychology at Georgetown University.  Her research focuses on understanding the learning and memory mechanisms that develop during infancy. Because infants are preverbal, her techniques rely on imitation and learning methods to find out what infants have learned and how well and how long they remember it. Her previous research has focused on how infants pick up information from different media sources, television, siblings, adults, and different contexts. Most recently, Barr's studies focus on factors that might enhance infant learning from television.

Barr's lab is called the Georgetown Early Learning Project. Information about the research conducted can be found at http://www.elp.georgetown.edu/.

In 2005, Barr became part of the Sesame Beginnings Advisory Board, which included other "national child development and media experts".. This year also marked her involvement in the ZERO TO THREE Leaders Development Initiative.

She is currently a reviewer for many popular and prestigious peer journals including: Journal of Experimental Child Psychology, Infant Behavior and Development, Developmental Psychobiology, Developmental Psychology, Developmental Science, Current Directions in Psychological Science, Archives of Pediatric and Adolescent Research, Child Development, Infant and Child Development. Her posters and presentations are often found at international child development conferences such as SRCD and ISIS.

Her education includes a Ph.D. in Developmental Psychology (completed in 1998), Diploma in Clinical Psychology, and BSc. (Hons) in Psychology from the University of Otago.

Publications

 Brito, N., Barr, R., McIntyre, P. & Simcock, G. . "Long-term transfer of learning from books and video during toddlerhood. ."  Journal of Experimental Child Psychology 111 (2012): 108–119.
 Barr R; Brito N; Rodriguez J; Shauffer, C. "Developing an Effective Intervention for Incarcerated Teen Fathers: The Baby Elmo Program."Zero to Three 32.5 (2012): 26-32.
 Barr, R. & Brito, N. (2012). Learning from television in young children. In N. Seel (Ed.), Encyclopedia of the Sciences of Learning, New York: Springer. Doi. 10.1007/978-1-4419-1428-6_1835.
 Barr, R. & Rovee-Collier, C. (2012). Learning and Memory. In N.M. Seel, Encyclopedia of the Sciences of Learning. New York, NY: Springer Publications. Doi. 10.1007/978-1-4419-1428-6_1918.
 Simcock, G., Garrity, K.* & Barr, R. . "The effect of narrative cues on infants’ imitation from television and picture books. ." Child Development 82 (2011): 1607-1619.
 Barr, R., Brito, N., Zocca, J., Reina, S., Rodriguez, J. & Shauffer, C.. "The Baby Elmo Program: Improving teen parent-child interactions within juvenile justice facilities. ." Children and Youth Services Review 33 (2011): 1555–1562.
 Bank, A. M., Barr, R., Calvert, S. L., Parrott, W. P., McDonough, S., & Rosenblum, K. . "Maternal Depression and Family Media Use: A Questionnaire and Diary Analysis. ." Journal of Child and Family Studies. (2011).
 Barr, R., Rovee-Collier, C. & Learmonth, A. E. . "Potentiation in Young Infants: The Origin of the Prior Knowledge Effect? ." Memory and Cognition 39 (2011): 625-636.
 Fenstermacher, S. K., Barr, R., Brey, E., Pempek, T. A., Ryan, M., Calvert, S., Shwery, C. E., & Linebarger, D. . "Interactional Quality Depicted in Infant-Directed Videos: Where are the interactions?." Infant and Child Development 19 (2010): 594-612.
 Fenstermacher, S. K., Linebarger, D., Pempek, T. A., Garcia, A., Salerno, K., Barr, R, Shwery, C.E. & Calvert, S. . "). Infant-directed media: An analysis of product information and claims." Infant and Child Development 19 (2010): 557-576.
 Vaala, S., Linebarger, D. L., Fenstermacher, S., Tedone, A., Brey, E., Barr, R., Moses, A., Shwery, C., Calvert, S. L.. "Content analysis of language-promoting teaching strategies used in infant directed media? ." Infant and Child Development 19 (2010): 628-648.
 Barr, R. & Linebarger, D. . "Introduction to the Special issue on the content and context of early media exposure. ." Infant and Child Development 19 (2010): 552-556.
 Barr, R., Danziger, C., Hilliard, M., Andolina, C., & Ruskis J.. "Amount, content and context of infant media exposure: A parental questionnaire and diary analysis. ." International Journal of Early Years Education, 18 (2010): 107-122.
 Lauricella, A. L., Pempek, T. A., Barr, R. & Calvert, S. L. . "Contingent Computer Interactions for Young Children’s Object Retrieval Success.." Journal of Applied Developmental Psychology 31 (2010): 362-369.
 Barr, R., Shuck, L., Salerno, K., Atkinson, E., & Linebarger, D. . "Music interferes with learning from television during infancy. ." Infant and Child Development, 19 (2010): 313 – 331.
 Vandewater, E., Park, S. E., Lee, S. J. & Barr, R. . "A US Study of Transfer of Learning from Video to Books in Toddlers." Journal of Children and Media 4 (2010): 451-466.
 Fidler, A., Zack, E., & Barr, R.. "Television Viewing Patterns in 6- to 18-month-olds: The Role of Caregiver-infant Interactional Quality."Infancy 15 (2010): 176-196.
 Barr, R., Lauricella, A., Zack, E., & Calvert, S. L. . "The relation between infant exposure to television and executive functioning, cognitive skills, and school readiness at age four. ." Merrill Palmer Quarterly 56 (2010): 21-48.
 Barr, R.. "Transfer of learning between 2D and 3D sources during infancy: Informing theory and practice. ." Developmental Review 30 (2010): 128-154.
 Rovee-Collier, C., & Barr, R. . "Infant Learning and Memory." Blackwell Handbook of Infant Development, 2nd Edition. Ed. In J. G. Bremner & T. Wachs . Chichester: Wiley-Blackwell, 2010: 271-294
 Zack, E., Barr, R., Gerhardstein, P., Dickerson, K. & Meltzoff, A. N. . "Infant imitation from television using novel touch-screen technology.." British Journal of Developmental Psychology 27 (2009): 13–26.
 Lauricella, A., Barr, R., & Calvert, S. "Computer skills: Influences of young children’s executive functioning abilities and parental scaffolding techniques. ." Journal of Children and Media, 3 (2009): 271-233.
 Barr, R., Wyss, N., & Somanader, M.. " Imitation from television during infancy: The role of sound effects. ." Journal of Experimental Child Psychology 123 (2009): 1-16.
 Barr, R., Zack, E., Muentener, P., & Garcia, A.. " Infants’ attention and responsiveness to television increases with prior exposure and parental interaction.." Infancy 13 (2008): 3-56.
 Barr, R. & Wyss, N.. " Reenactment of televised content by 2-year-olds: Toddlers use language learned from television to solve a difficult imitation problem.." Infant Behavior and Development 31 (2008): 696-703.
 Barr, R.. "Attention to and learning from media during infancy and early childhood." Blackwell Handbook of Child Development and the Media. Ed. S.L. Calvert & B. J. Wilson. Malden, MA: Blackwell, 2008: 143-165.
 Vandewater, E., Park, S. E., Lee, S. J. & Barr, R. (2008). The Impact of Video on Infants and Toddlers: Can Video be a Teaching Tool? Invited article, International Society for the Study of Behavioural Development Newsletter, 2, 13-17.
 Shivers, E and Barr R.. "Exploring cultural differences in children’s exposure to television in home-based child care settings." Zero to Three Journal (2007).
 Barr, R., Muentener, P., Garcia, A., Fujimoto, M. & Chavez, V.. "The effect of repetition on imitation from television during infancy. ."Developmental Psychobiology 49.3 (2007): 196-207.
 Barr, R., Muentener, P., & Garcia, A. . " Age-related changes in deferred imitation from television by 6- to 18-month-olds." Developmental Science 10 (2007): 910–921.
 Barr. "Developing Social Understanding in a Social Context." Blackwell Handbook of Early Child Development. Ed. K. McCartney & D. Phillips . Malden, MA: Blackwell, 2006: 188-207.
 Barr, R. (2006) Exposure to television during early childhood. J. J. Arnett (Ed.). Encyclopedia of Children, Adolescents, and the Media. Sage Publications. Toledo, OH, p. 410-412.
 Calvert, S., Rideout, V., Woolard, J., Barr, R. & Strouse, G. "Age, ethnicity, and socioeconomic patterns in early computer use: A national survey." American Behavioral Scientist 48 (2005): 590-607.
 Barr, R., Rovee-Collier, C. & Campanella, J.. "Retrieval Protracts Deferred Imitation by 6-Month-Olds.." Infancy 7.3 (2005): 263-284.
 Barr, R. (2005). Imitation. N. J. Salkind & K. DeRuyck (Eds.). The Encyclopedia of Human Development. Sage Publications. Toledo, OH, p. 673-675.
 Barr, R., & Hayne, H. (2003). It’s not what you know it’s who you know: Older siblings facilitate imitation during infancy. International Journal of Early Years Education, 11, 7-21.
 Barr, R., Marrott, H., & Rovee-Collier, C. (2003). The role of sensory preconditioning in memory retrieval by preverbal infants. Learning and Behavior, 31, 111-123.
 Hayne, H., Barr, R., & Herbert J. (2003). The Effect of Prior Practice on Memory Reactivation and Generalization. Child Development, 74, 1615-1627.
 Barr, R. (2002). Imitation as a learning mechanism and research tool: how does imitation interact with other cognitive functions? Peer Commentaries on Stephen C. Want and Paul L. Harris's How do children ape? Applying concepts from the study of non-human primates to the developmental study of 'imitation' in children. Developmental Science, 5, 16-18.
 Barr, R., Vieira, A., & Rovee-Collier, C. (2001). Mediated imitation in 6-month-olds: Remembering by association. Journal of Experimental Child Psychology, 79, 229-252.
 Rovee-Collier, C. & Barr, R. (2001). Infant cognition. In H. Pashler (series ed.), Stevens' handbook of experimental psychology (3rd ed.). Vol. 4: Methodology (pp. 693-791). J. Wixted, Vol. Ed. New York: Wiley
 Rovee-Collier, C., & Barr, R. (2001). Infant learning and memory. In J.G. Bremner & A. Fogel (Eds.), Blackwell handbook of infant development, (pp. 139-168). Oxford: Blackwell Publishers.
 Barr, R., & Hayne, H. (2000). Age-related changes in imitation: Implications for memory development. In C. Rovee-Collier, L. P. Lipsitt, & H. Hayne (Eds.), Progress in infancy research (Vol. 1, pp. 21-67). Mahwah, NJ: Erlbaum.
 Hayne, H., Boniface, J., & Barr, R. (2000). The development of declarative memory in human infants: Age-related changes in deferred imitation. Behavioral Neuroscience, 114, 77-83.
 Barr, R., & Hayne, H. (1999). Developmental changes in imitation from television during infancy. Child Development, 70, 1067-1081.
 Hayne, H., MacDonald, S., & Barr, R. (1997). Developmental changes in the specificity of memory over the second year of life. Infant Behavior and Development, 20, 233-245.
 Barr, R., Dowden, A., & Hayne, H. (1996). Developmental changes in deferred imitation by 6- to 24-month-old infants. Infant Behavior and Development, 19, 159-171.
 Barr, R., & Hayne, H. (1996). The effect of event structure on imitation in infancy: Practice makes perfect? Infant Behavior and Development, 19, 255-259.

Notes

References

Georgetown University faculty
Living people
Year of birth missing (living people)
Sesame Street crew
University of Otago alumni